"I Spy I Spy" (stylized as "i spy i spy") is a collaboration single by Japanese artist Superfly and Australian band Jet that was released in the name of "Superfly×JET" to the Japanese market on November 28, 2007. Superfly travelled to Sydney to record the song with Jet.

It reached 55th place on the Oricon weekly singles chart and charted for seven weeks. "I Spy I Spy" was used in a commercial for the Nissan Cube. It is the first single that does not feature Superfly's guitarist Kōichi Tabo.

Track listing

References

2007 singles
2007 songs
Superfly (band) songs
Jet (band) songs
Songs used as jingles
Songs written by Chris Cester
Warner Music Japan singles